Portland-Simonds is a provincial electoral district for the Legislative Assembly of New Brunswick, Canada.  It was originally created for the 1995 provincial election as Saint John Portland and its boundaries were altered slightly in 2006.  It in the 2013 redrawing of boundaries its boundaries were moved significantly southward into territory previously part of Saint John East; though the boundaries commission did not recommend a name change, a committee of the legislative assembly later voted to change the name to Portland-Simonds. The riding name refers to Portland and Simonds Parish in Saint John County.

Members of the Legislative Assembly

Election results

Portland-Simonds

Saint John Portland

References

External links 
Website of the Legislative Assembly of New Brunswick

New Brunswick provincial electoral districts
Politics of Saint John, New Brunswick